A seawall (or sea wall) is a form of coastal defense constructed where the sea, and associated coastal processes, impact directly upon the landforms of the coast. The purpose of a seawall is to protect areas of human habitation, conservation and leisure activities from the action of tides, waves, or tsunamis. As a seawall is a static feature it will conflict with the dynamic nature of the coast and impede the exchange of sediment between land and sea.

Seawall designs factor in local climate, coastal position, wave regime (determined by wave characteristics and effectors), and value (morphological characteristics) of landform. Seawalls are hard engineering shore-based structures which protect the coast from erosion. Various environmental issues may arise from the construction of a seawall, including the disruption of sediment movement and transport patterns. Combined with a high construction cost, this has led to an increasing use of other soft engineering coastal management options such as beach replenishment.

Seawalls are constructed from various materials, most commonly reinforced concrete, boulders, steel, or gabions. Other possible construction materials include vinyl, wood, aluminum, fiberglass composite, and biodegradable sandbags made of jute and coir. In the UK, seawall also refers to an earthen bank used to create a polder, or a dike construction. The type of material used for construction is hypothesized to affect the settlement of coastal organisms, although the precise mechanism has yet to be identified.

Types
A seawall works by reflecting incident wave energy back into the sea, thus reducing the energy available to cause erosion. Seawalls have two specific weaknesses. Wave reflection from the wall may result in hydrodynamic scour and subsequent lowering of the sand level of the fronting beach.  Seawalls may also accelerate erosion of adjacent, unprotected coastal areas by affecting the littoral drift process.

Different designs of man-made tsunami barriers include building reefs and forests to above-ground and submerged seawalls. In 2005, India began planting Casuarina and coconut saplings on its coast as a natural barrier against future tsunamis like the 2004 Indian Ocean earthquake. Studies have found that an offshore tsunami wall could reduce tsunami wave heights by up to 83%.

The appropriate seawall design relies on location-specific aspects, including surrounding erosion processes. There are three main types of seawalls: vertical, curved or stepped, and mounds (see table below).

Natural barriers 
A report published by the United Nations Environment Programme (UNEP) suggests that the tsunami of 26 December 2004 caused less damage in the areas where natural barriers were present, such as mangroves, coral reefs or coastal vegetation. A Japanese study of this tsunami in Sri Lanka used satellite imagery modelling to establish the parameters of coastal resistance as a function of different types of trees. Natural barriers, such as coral reefs and mangrove forests, prevent the spread of tsunamis and the flow of coastal waters and mitigated the flood and surge of water.

Trade-offs
A cost-benefit approach is an effective way to determine whether a seawall is appropriate and whether the benefits are worth the expense. Besides controlling erosion, consideration must be given to the effects of hardening a shoreline on natural coastal ecosystems and human property or activities. A seawall is a static feature which can conflict with the dynamic nature of the coast and impede the exchange of sediment between land and sea. The table below summarizes some positive and negative effects of seawalls which can be used when comparing their effectiveness with other coastal management options, such as beach nourishment.

Generally seawalls can be a successful way to control coastal erosion, but only if they are constructed well and out of materials which can withstand the force of ongoing wave energy. Some understanding is needed of the coastal processes and morphodynamics specific to the seawall location. Seawalls can be very helpful; they can offer a more long-term solution than soft engineering options, additionally providing recreation opportunities and protection from extreme events as well as everyday erosion. Extreme natural events expose weaknesses in the performance of seawalls, and analyses of these can lead to future improvements and reassessment.

Issues

Sea level rise
Sea level rise creates an issue for seawalls worldwide as it raises both the mean normal water level and the height of waves during extreme weather events, which the current seawall heights may be unable to cope with. The most recent analyses of long, good-quality tide gauge records (corrected for GIA and when possible for other vertical land motions by the Global Positioning System, GPS) indicate a mean rate of sea level rise of 1.6–1.8 mm/yr over the twentieth century. The Intergovernmental Panel on Climate Change (IPCC) (1997) suggested that sea level rise over the next 50 – 100 years will accelerate with a projected increase in global mean sea level of +18 cm by 2050 AD. This data is reinforced by Hannah (1990) who calculated similar statistics including a rise of between +16-19.3 cm throughout 1900–1988. Super storm Sandy of 2012 is an example of the devastating effects rising sea levels can cause when mixed with a perfect storm. Super storm Sandy sent a storm surge of 4–5 m onto New Jersey's and New York's barrier island and urban shorelines, estimated at $70 billion in damage. This problem could be overcome by further modelling and determining the extension of height and reinforcement of current seawalls which needs to occur for safety to be ensured in both situations. Sea level rise also will cause a higher risk in flooding and taller tsunamis.

Hydrostatic water pressure
Seawalls, like all retaining walls, must relieve the buildup of water pressure. Water pressure buildup is caused when groundwater is not drained from behind the seawall. Groundwater against a seawall can be from the area's natural water-table, rain percolating into the ground behind the wall and waves overtopping the wall.  The water-table can also rise during periods of high water (high tide). Lack of adequate drainage can cause the seawall to buckle, move, bow, crack or collapse.  Sinkholes may also develop as the escaping water pressure erodes soil through or around the drainage system.

Extreme events
Extreme events also pose a problem as it is not easy for people to predict or imagine the strength of hurricane or storm induced waves compared to normal, expected wave patterns. An extreme event can dissipate hundreds of times more energy than everyday waves, and calculating structures which will stand the force of coastal storms is difficult and, often the outcome can become unaffordable. For example, Omaha Beach seawall in New Zealand was designed to prevent erosion from everyday waves only, and when a storm in 1976 carved out ten meters behind the existing seawall, the whole structure was destroyed.

Ecosystem impacts 
The addition of seawalls near marine ecosystems can lead to increased shadowing effects in the waters surrounding the seawall. Shadowing reduces the light and visibility within the water, which may disrupt the distribution as well as foraging capabilities of certain species. The sediment surrounding seawalls tends to have less favorable physical properties (Higher calcification levels, less structural organization of crystalline structure, low silicone content and less macroscale roughness) when compared to natural shorelines, which can present issues for species that reside on the seafloor.

Other issues
Some further issues include: lack of long term trend data of seawall effects due to a relatively short duration of data records; modelling limitations and comparisons of different projects and their effects being invalid or unequal due to different beach types; materials; currents; and environments. Lack of maintenance is also a major issue with seawalls. In 2013, more than 5,000 feet (1,500 m) of seawall was found to be crumbling in Punta Gorda, Florida. Residents of the area pay hundreds of dollars each year into a seawall repair program. The problem is that most of the seawalls are over a half century old and are being destroyed by only heavy downpours. If not kept in check, seawalls lose effectiveness and become expensive to repair.

History and examples

Seawall construction has existed since ancient times. In the first century BCE, Romans built a seawall / breakwater at Caesarea Maritima
creating an artificial harbor (Sebastos Harbor).  The construction used Pozzolana concrete which hardens in contact with sea water.  Barges were constructed and filled with the concrete.  They were floated into position and sunk.  The resulting harbor / breakwater / seawall is still in existence today – more than 2000 years later.

The oldest known coastal defense is believed to be a 100-meter row of boulders in the Mediterranean Sea off the coast of Israel. The boulders were positioned in an attempt to protect the coastal settlement of Tel Hreiz from the sea rise following the last glacial maximum. Tel Hreiz was discovered in 1960 by divers searching for shipwrecks, but the row of boulders was not found until storms cleared the sand cover in 2012.

More recently, seawalls were constructed in 1623 in Canvey Island, UK, when great floods of the Thames estuary occurred, prompting the construction of protection for further events in this flood prone area. Since then, seawall design has become more complex and intricate in response to an improvement in materials, technology and an understanding of how coastal processes operate. This section will outline some key case studies of seawalls in chronological order and describe how they have performed in response to tsunami or ongoing natural processes and how effective they were in these situations. Analysing the successes and shortcomings of seawalls during severe natural events allows their weaknesses to be exposed, and areas become visible for future improvement.

Canada
The Vancouver Seawall is a stone seawall constructed around the perimeter of Stanley Park in Vancouver, British Columbia. The seawall was constructed initially as waves created by ships passing through the First Narrows were eroding the area between Prospect Point and Brockton Point. Construction of the seawall began in 1917, and since then this pathway has become one of the most used features of the park by both locals and tourists and now extends 22 km in total.

Overall, the Vancouver Seawall is a prime example of how seawalls can simultaneously provide shoreline protection and a source of recreation which enhances human enjoyment of the coastal environment. It also illustrates that although shoreline erosion is a natural process, human activities, interactions with the coast and poorly planned shoreline development projects can accelerate natural erosion rates.

India 
On December 26, 2004, towering waves of the 2004 Indian Ocean earthquake tsunami crashed against India's south-eastern coastline killing thousands. However, the former French colonial enclave of Pondicherry escaped unscathed. This was primarily due to French engineers who had constructed (and maintained) a massive stone seawall during the time when the city was a French colony.

The barrier was initially completed in 1735 and over the years, the French continued to fortify the wall, piling huge boulders along its  coastline to stop erosion from the waves pounding the harbor. The boulders, some weighing up to a ton, are weathered black and brown. The seawall is inspected every year and whenever gaps appear or the stones sink into the sand, the government adds more boulders to keep it strong.

The Union Territory of Pondicherry recorded around 600 deaths from the huge tsunami waves that struck India's coast after the mammoth underwater earthquake (which measured 9.0 on the moment magnitude scale) off Indonesia, but most of those killed were fishermen who lived in villages beyond the artificial barrier which reinforces the effectiveness of seawalls.

Japan
At least 43 percent of Japan's  coastline is lined with concrete seawalls or other structures designed to protect the country against high waves, typhoons or even tsunamis. During the 2011 Tōhoku earthquake and tsunami, the seawalls in most areas were overwhelmed.

The risks of dependence on seawalls was most evident in the crisis at the Fukushima Dai-ichi and Fukushima Dai-ni nuclear power plants, both located along the coast close to the earthquake zone, as the tsunami washed over walls that were supposed to protect the plants. Arguably, the additional defense provided by the seawalls presented an extra margin of time for citizens to evacuate and also stopped some of the full force of energy which would have caused the wave to climb higher in the backs of coastal valleys. In contrast, the seawalls also acted in a negative way to trap water and delay its retreat.

The failure of the world's largest seawall, which cost $1.5 billion to construct, shows that building stronger seawalls to protect larger areas would have been even less cost-effective. In the case of the ongoing crisis at the nuclear power plants, higher and stronger seawalls should have been built if power plants were to be built at that site. Fundamentally, the devastation in coastal areas and a final death toll predicted to exceed 10,000 could push Japan to redesign its seawalls or consider more effective alternative methods of coastal protection for extreme events. Such hardened coastlines can also provide a false sense of security to property owners and local residents as evident in this situation.

Seawalls along the Japanese coast have also been criticized for cutting settlements off from the sea, making beaches unusable, presenting an eyesore, disturbing wildlife, and being unnecessary.

United States

After 2012's Hurricane Sandy, New York City mayor Bill de Blasio invested $3 billion in a hurricane restoration fund, with part of the money dedicated to building new seawalls and protection from future hurricanes.
A New York Harbor Storm-Surge Barrier has been proposed, but not voted on or funded by Congress or the State of New York.

In Florida, tiger dams are used to protect homes near the coast.

See also 
 Breakwater (structure)
 Mole (architecture)
General:
 
 

Related types of walls:
 
 
 
 
 

Specific walls:
 
 
 
 
 
 
 
  (Constantinople seawalls)

References

External links

Channel Coastal Observatory – Seawalls
 Seawalls and defences on the Isle of Wight
 MEDUS (Maritime Engineering Division University Salerno)
 "Japan may rethink seawalls after tsunami", New York Times, March 14, 2011
 General overview of residential and small commercial steel seawall construction

Coastal engineering